Edith's Shopping Bag (1976) is an American short documentary video about the opening of Edith Massey's thrift store in Baltimore.

Cast 
 Edith Massey
 John Waters
 Mink Stole
 Mary Vivian Pearce
 Bob Adams
 Vincent Peranio
 Paul Swift
 Danny Mills
 Ed Peranio
 A.J. Tipping
 Peter Koper
 Laurel Douglas
 Charlie Ludlow

See also 
 Love Letter to Edie, a 1975 documentary about Massey

References

External links 
 
 

1976 films
American short documentary films
American independent films
1970s short documentary films
1976 independent films
Documentary films about women in film
John Waters
1970s English-language films
1970s American films